E23 may refer to: 
 BMW E23
 British submarine HMS E23
 European route E23
 Nimzo-Indian Defense, Encyclopaedia of Chess Openings code
 Higashi-Meihan Expressway and Ise Expressway, route E23 in Japan
 Citybus Route E23 in Hong Kong